Yari (U100i) (Kita in the Philippines) is a slider phone from Sony Ericsson as a successor to the Sony Ericsson F305. It was unveiled on December 14, 2009. It is a phone meant for entertainment (e.g. games, music). It is available in two colors: Cranberry Red and Achromatic Black. It is the lowest end model for the Sony Ericsson entertainment series. It has three related phones, the Aino, Satio and Vivaz. It has motion sensing functions as well as an "MSN"-like chat function while sending text messages.

References

External links
 Official website

Yari
Mobile phones introduced in 2009